Season 2004–05 was Airdrie United's third competitive season. They competed in the First Division, Challenge Cup, League Cup and the Scottish Cup.

Summary
Airdrie United finished fifth in the First Division. They reached the third round of the Scottish Cup, the second round of the League Cup and were eliminated in the first round of the Challenge Cup.

League table

Results and fixtures

First Division

Challenge Cup

League Cup

Scottish Cup

Player statistics

Squad 

|}
a.  Includes other competitive competitions, including playoffs and the Scottish Challenge Cup.

References

Airdrieonians F.C. seasons
Airdrie United